Ross MacKenzie is the name of

 Ross MacKenzie (sprinter) (born 1946), Canadian sprinter
 Ross MacKenzie (footballer) (born 1984), Scottish footballer

See also
 Ross McKenzie